Chikurachki (Chikura-dake) is the highest volcano on Paramushir Island in the northern Kuril Islands. It is actually a relatively small volcanic cone constructed on a high Pleistocene volcanic edifice. Oxidized andesitic scoria deposits covering the upper part of the young cone gives it a distinctive red color.

See also
 List of volcanoes in Russia
 List of ultras of Northeast Asia

Notes

References

 
 "Vulkan Chikurachki, Russia" on Peakbagger

Stratovolcanoes of Russia
Active volcanoes
Paramushir
Volcanoes of the Kuril Islands